Yossawat Montha (born November 11, 1995) is a Thai professional footballer who plays as a left-back for Thai League 1 club Lampang.

References
thaileague.co.th

1995 births
Living people
Yossawat Montha
Yossawat Montha
Yossawat Montha
Yossawat Montha
Yossawat Montha
Yossawat Montha
Yossawat Montha
Association football fullbacks